Rodrigo Muxfeldt Gularte (13 July 1972 – 29 April 2015) was a Brazilian citizen who was executed in Indonesia by firing squad for drug trafficking.

Gularte was diagnosed with schizophrenia and bipolar disorder. According to news reports, he did not realise he was going to die until minutes before his execution.

Early life

Rodrigo Gularte was born into a wealthy family in the southern Brazilian city of Foz do Iguaçu, Paraná. He was a keen surfer and relatives remember him as a tall, gentle, polite and kind young boy who slipped into depression, and became involved in drugs after his parents divorced when he was 13.

His  first treatment for drug addiction was at 16, when relatives say they had noticed signs of bipolarity. Other treatments would ensue, without success, and Gularte developed depression coupled with the use of drugs. His mother Clarisse tried to help him with work. Gularte gained, for example, a restaurant to administer, paid by his mother. He also had a son with autism, born when he was 21, Jimmy Gularte, with whom he had little contact. But his contact with drugs of all kinds, continued. During his 20s he travelled through Latin America with friends, drinking and taking various kinds of drugs.

Sponsored by his mother, Rodrigo traveled through Latin America to the United States, Africa and Europe - consuming all kinds of drugs. "I thought these trips would do him well, he would wind down, get rid of bad influences," says his mother Clarisse.  The result was the opposite.  Increasing his addiction, Rodrigo returned in 1994 to Curitiba.  At 24, without work or study, nocturnal, Rodrigo was involved in a serious traffic accident after leaving a party, drunk and drugged.  To avoid his arrest, Mrs. Clarisse admitted her son to rehab.  After six months of detoxification, in 1996, Rodrigo tried to change his life.  He became an entrepreneur, but two restaurants of his failed.  In 1999, he passed the entrance exam to liberal arts at the Federal University of Santa Catarina. In the middle of the course, he dropped out. He then returned to travelling through Europe and Latin America bringing in various types of cannabis. In 2004, the opportunity arose to take the surfboards stuffed with cocaine to Indonesia.

Arrest

In the late 1990s and early 2000s, Bali was an international destination for young travellers attracted by a hippie vibe, surf culture and electronic dance music parties where cocaine and ecstasy were available at clubs, as was marijuana, supplied by Italian and Brazilian drug traffickers who often used young surfers as mules. Gularte lived in Florianópolis since 1999 when he was arrested in August 2004 with 6 kg of cocaine hidden in surfboards. The arrest, along with two other men who lived in the capital, took place at Jakarta airport in Indonesia. The trio was caught with eight boards stuffed with six kilos of cocaine, but Rodrigo took over sole responsibility for the transportation of narcotics.

Conviction and imprisonment
He was sentenced to death on 7 February 2005 by Indonesian government. During his early period in prison, Gularte shared a cell with fellow Brazilian convicted Marco Archer Moreira.

After his conviction, Gularte tried to commit suicide in prison in 2006. His mental health was worsening
and a diagnosis of paranoid schizophrenia with delusions and hallucinations was detected. There was a recommendation that he should be transferred to a psychiatric hospital. However Indonesian authorities did not allow his transfer since the experts were hired by the defense. The Gularte family tried, without success, to obtain clemency for him by saying doctors have diagnosed him as paranoid schizophrenic, which would normally allow him to be transferred to a psychiatric facility. The Brazilian government called for him to be spared the death penalty for humanitarian reasons.

Execution
Gularte was executed in Indonesia on 29 April 2015 at Nusa Kambangan, Central Java, Indonesia. He had been sentenced to death for drug trafficking, and the sentence was executed by a firing squad. According to his lawyer, Gularte did not know he would be shot. Roman Catholic priest Charlie Burrows was with Gularte minutes before the execution, at the request of the family and the condemned. Before his death Gularte received spiritual comfort and last rites of the Roman Catholic Church.

Gularte's body was taken to the Saint Carolus Hospital, in Jakarta. Gularte's photo, and a cross with his name and the date of his birth and his death were beside the coffin. His body was transported to Brazil, where he was buried at the request of Gularte.

A day after Gularte's death, a Catholic Mass was celebrated in honour of him.

Rodrigo Gularte's body was concealed and buried in Curitiba, Paraná, on 3 May 2015, after a Mass celebrated in honour of him.

Reactions

According to the Brazilian government, Gularte's death is a "serious event" in relations between Brazil and Indonesia. The note says that Brazil will work in international human rights bodies for the abolition of the death penalty.

A government's statement against death penalty applied by Indonesia was read by the Secretary General of Foreign Affairs, Sérgio Danese, during an interview given at Itamaraty.

The Secretary-General of the United Nations, Ban Ki-moon expressed "deep regret" for the execution of eight convicted of drug trafficking in Indonesia, including Rodrigo Gularte. Ki-moon expressed deep regret at the executions carried out in Indonesia, despite numerous requests in the country and internationally to interrupt it.

See also
Marco Archer Moreira

References

1972 births
2015 deaths
2015 in Brazil
2015 in Indonesia
21st-century Brazilian criminals
Brazilian drug traffickers
Brazilian people executed abroad
Brazilian Roman Catholics
People executed by Indonesia by firing squad
People with bipolar disorder
People with schizophrenia
Inmates of Nusa Kambangan prison
People from Foz do Iguaçu
People executed for drug offences
21st-century executions by Indonesia